Chwastnica may refer to the following places in Poland:
Chwastnica in Gmina Domaniów, Oława County in Lower Silesian Voivodeship (SW Poland)
Other places called Chwastnica (listed in Polish Wikipedia)